This list of newspapers in Trinidad and Tobago is a list of newspapers printed and distributed in the Trinidad and Tobago.  It includes a list of daily newspapers, weekly and specialty newspapers, community newspapers and magazines published in Trinidad and Tobago.

Trinidad and Tobago has three national newspapers.

Trinidad and Tobago newspapers

National daily newspapers
 Trinidad and Tobago's Newsday, national, 19-21 Chacon Street, Port of Spain (North Office)
 Trinidad Express Newspapers, national, 35-37 Independence Square, Port of Spain (North Office, Production House)
 Trinidad and Tobago Guardian, national, 22-24 St. Vincent Street, Port of Spain (North Office) 4-10 Rodney Road, Chaguanas (Central Office)

Weekly and specialty newspapers
 The Anglican Outlook, 2 Hayes Street, St. Clair, Port of Spain
 Blast Newspaper, 5-6 Hingoo Lands, San Juan
 Bomb Newspaper, Southern Main Road & Clifford St. Curepe
 The Catholic News
 The Eastern Times, Sunset Drive, Arouca
 Hello Small Business & Tradesman News
 The Independent, 20 Abercromby Street, Port of Spain
 The Moruga Chronicle, Moruga Road, Basse Terre, Moruga
 The Probe
 The Village Newspaper, Hosein Drive, Tacarigua; Newspapers in Trinidad & Tobago 
 Jobhuntt Classified Limited, Golden Doors Plaza, Port Of Spain in Trinidad & Tobago
 Kid Life Newspaper, Hosein Drive, Tacarigua; Newspapers for children in Trinidad & Tobago
 Showtime Newspaper, Ninth Street & Ninth Avenue, Barataria (North Office)
 Sunday Punch Newspaper, Ninth Street & Ninth Avenue, Barataria (North Office)
 TnT Mirror, Ninth Street & Ninth Avenue, Barataria,
 The Trinidad and Tobago Sunshine Newspaper, Kantac Plaza, Arouca
The Weekend Heat, Southern Main Road, Curepe

Tobago newspapers
 Tobago News, TIDCO Mall, Scarborough
 Tobago Pillar, U Turn Mall, Wilson Road, Scarborough, Tobago

Monthly journals
 Trinidad and Tobago Review, Trinidad & Tobago Institute of the West Indies at Tapia House, 82–84 St. Vincent Street, Tunapuna

Magazines
 Abstract Magazine
 Boca - marine and yachting magazine
 Bushlife Magazine - We carry the role of promoting herbs and tea consumption to Trinidad and Tobago and the wider Caribbean. Published by the TEA & HERBAL MEDICINE ASSOCIATION @HarbariumTT on Facebook.
 Business Trinidad and Tobago
 Caribbean Beat - Caribbean Airlines inflight magazine
 Caribbean E-Business Magazine
 Coco Belle Magazine - beauty and lifestyle Caribbean magazine 
 Comic Publisher
 Contact Magazine
 Critical Analysis
 Discover Trinidad and Tobago
 The Draft
 Executive Time
 Exporter
 Ins and Outs of Trinidad and Tobago
 Island Sports and Fitness
 Just Comics and More
 Living World Journal
 MACO magazines - MACO Caribbean Living, MACO People Trinidad, and MACO People Barbados
 Paradise Pulse - online lifestyle magazine
 Ranting Trini
 St Augustine News - UWI
 Scorch
 SixthSpeed Tuner Magazine
 Sweet TnT Magazine
 Tobago Today
 Topsoil Magazine
 TT NRG - local publication on oil and gas
 Trin Mag
 Trinidad-Tobago Net
 The Westerly
 UWI Today
 Vox
 Who's Who in Trinidad and Tobago Business
 Zorce Racing Magazine

News websites 
 www.trinidadexpress.com - Trinidad Express
 www.tv6tnt.com - CCN TV6
 www.cnc3.co.tt - CNC 3 TV
 www.guardian.co.tt - Guardian
 www.wired868.com - Wired 868
  sweettntmagazine.com - Sweet TnT Magazine

References

External links
 Sweet TnT Magazine Official website
 CCN TV6 official site
 Trinidad Express official site
 Trinidad Guardian official site
 Trinidad and Tobago's Newsday official site
 TnT Mirror official site
 The Catholic News official site
 Caribbean Beat official site
 Discover Trinidad & Tobago official site
 MACO Magazines official site

Trinidad and Tobago
List
Newspapers